Marigüitar is a small coastal town in the state of Sucre, Venezuela.  It lies on the southern coast of the Gulf of Cariaco, across from the Araya Peninsula.  The nearest city is Cumaná, about 20 kilometers to the east.  The narrow, winding road that connects Cumaná and Carúpano passes through the town.  Marigüitar has a large fish-processing plant owned by Mavesa, which is a subsidiary of Empresas Polar, the largest food and drink company in Venezuela. The fish processing plant serves as the principal source of employment for the town's residents.  A small fleet of buses, pick-up trucks, and privately owned cars provide transportation from the town to the surrounding communities and to Cumaná.

Populated places in Sucre (state)
Populated coastal places in Venezuela